Nick Bastaja (born February 4, 1953 in Grantham, England) is a former professional Canadian football offensive lineman who played fourteen seasons in the Canadian Football League. He was part of the Grey Cup championship-winning Winnipeg Blue Bombers teams of 1984 and 1988. Bastaja won the CFL's Most Outstanding Offensive Lineman Award in the 1985 CFL season.

After his retirement as a player, Bastaja spent two seasons as a colour commentator for CFL games on the Canadian Football Network.

References 

Career stats and bio

1953 births
Living people
People from Grantham
Canadian players of Canadian football
English players of Canadian football
Canadian football offensive linemen
Hamilton Tiger-Cats players
Toronto Argonauts players
Winnipeg Blue Bombers players
Simon Fraser Clan football players
Simon Fraser University alumni
Canadian Football League announcers
Canadian people of Serbian descent
English people of Serbian descent